The Galliformes are a clade of bird species of cosmopolitan distribution that, with the Anseriformes, belong to the branch Galloanserae. The group have more than 270 living species and includes the megapodes, chachalacas, guans, curassows, turkeys, grouse, New World quails, pheasants, partridges and guineafowl. They are, with Neoaves, the two main lineages of Neognathae. Extinct species assignment follows the Mikko's Phylogeny Archive and Paleofile.com websites.

Summary of 2006 IUCN Red List categories

Conservation status [v2017.3, the data is current as of May 8, 2018]:
 - extinct, 
 - extinct in the wild
 - critically endangered
 - endangered
 - vulnerable
 - near threatened
 - least concern
 - data deficient
 - not evaluated

Phylogeny
Living Galliformes based on the work by John Boyd.

Species

Family †Gallinuloididae Lucas 1900
 Genus †Gallinuloides Eastman 1900
 †Gallinuloides wyomingensis Eastman 1900
 Genus †Paraortygoides Mayr 2000
 †Paraortygoides messelensis Mayr 2000
 †Paraortygoides radagasti Dyke & Gulas 2002

Family †Paraortygidae Mourer-Chauviré 1992
 Genus †Pirortyx Brodkorb 1964
†Pirortyx major (Gaillard 1939) Brodkorb 1964
 Genus †Scopelortyx Mourer-Chauviré, Pickford & Senut 2015
†Scopelortyx klinghardtensis Mourer-Chauviré, Pickford & Senut 2015
 Genus †Paraortyx Gaillard 1908 sensu Brodkorb 1964
†Paraortyx lorteti Gaillard 1908
†Paraortyx brancoi Gaillard 1908

Family †Quercymegapodiidae Mourer-Chauviré 1992
 Genus †Taubacrex de Alvarenga 1988
 †Taubacrex granivora de Alvarenga 1988
 Genus †Ameripodius de Alvarenga 1995
 †Ameripodius silvasantosi Alvarenga 1995
 †Ameripodius alexis Mourer-Chauviré 2000
 Genus †Quercymegapodius Mourer-Chauviré 1992
 †Quercymegapodius depereti (Gaillard 1908)
 †Quercymegapodius brodkorbi Mourer-Chauviré 1992

Family †Sylviornithidae Mourer-Chauviré et Balouet 2005
 Genus †Megavitiornis Worthy 2000
 Noble megapode/deep-billed megapode,  †Megavitiornis altirostris (Worthy 2000)
 Genus †Sylviornis Poplin 1980
 New Caledonian giant megapode, †Sylviornis neocaledoniae Poplin 1980

Family Megapodiidae Lesson, 1831

 Genus †Mwalau Worthy et al. 2015
 †Mwalau walterlinii Worthy et al. 2015
 Genus †Ngawupodius Boles & Ivison 1999
 †Ngawupodius minya Boles & Ivison 1999
 Tribe Alecturini
 Genus Aepypodius Oustalet 1880
 Wattled brushturkey, Aepypodius arfakianus (Salvadori 1877) 
 A. a. misoliensis Ripley 1957 (Misool wattled brushturkey)
 A. a. arfakianus (Salvadori 1877) (Arfak wattled brushturkey)
 Waigeo brushturkey, Aepypodius bruijnii (Oustalet 1880)   B1ab(ii,iii,v)+2ab(ii,iii,v); C2a(ii)
 Genus Alectura Gray 1831
 Australian brushturkey, Alectura lathami Gray 1831 
 A. l. purpureicollis (Le Souef 1898) (purple-pouched brushturkey)
 A. l. lathami Gray 1831 (yellow-pouched brushturkey)
 Genus Leipoa Gould 1840
 Giant Malleefowl, †Leipoa gallinacea (de Vis 1888) 
 Malleefowl, Leipoa ocellata Gould 1840  A2bce+3ce+4bce
 Genus Talegalla Lesson 1828
 Red-billed brushturkey, Talegalla cuvieri Lesson 1828 
 T. c. cuvieri Lesson 1828 (Cuvier's brushturkey)
 T. c. granti Roselaar 1994
 Black-billed brushturkey, Talegalla fuscirostris Salvadori 1877 
 T. f. fuscirostris Salvadori 1877
 T. f. occidentis White 1938
 T. f. aruensis Roselaar 1994
 T. f. meyeri Roselaar 1994
 Collared brushturkey, Talegalla jobiensis Meyer 1874 
 T. j. jobiensis Meyer 1874
 T. j. longicaudus Meyer 1891
 Tribe Megapodiini
 Genus Macrocephalon Müller 1846
 Maleo, Macrocephalon maleo Müller 1846  A2bcde+3bcde+4bcde
 Genus Eulipoa Ogilvie-Grant 1893
 Moluccan megapode, Eulipoa wallacei (Gray 1861) Ogilvie-Grant 1893  A2cde+3cde+4cde
 Genus Megapodius Gaimard 1823 (Scrubfowl, scrubhen, megapodes)
 Consumed scrubfowl, †M. alimentum Steatman 1989a
 †M. andamanensis Walter 1980 nomen dubium [oospecies]
 Burnaby's megapode, †M. burnabyi Gray 1861 nomen dubium [oospecies]
 Pile-builder Scrubfowl, †M. molistructor Balouet & Olson 1989
 Stair's megapode, †M. stairi
 Raoul Island scrubfowl, †M. sp.
 'Eua scrubfowl/small-fooed megapode, †M. sp.
 Lifuka scrubfowl, †M. sp.
 stout Tongan megapode, †M. sp.
 large Vanuatu megapode, †M. sp.
 large Solomon Islands, †M. sp.
 New Caledonia megapode, †M. sp.
 Loyalty megapode, †M. sp.
 New Ireland scrubfowl, large Bismarck's megapode, †M. sp.
 Viti Levu scrubfowl, lost megapode, †Megapodius amissus Worthy 2000
 Sula megapode, Megapodius bernsteinii Schlegel 1866  A2cde+3cde+4cde
 Philippine megapode, Megapodius cumingii Dillwyn 1853 
 M. c. cumingii Dillwyn 1853
 M. c. dillwyni Tweeddale 1878
 M. c. pusillus Tweeddale 1878
 M. c. tabon Hachisuka 1931 (tabon scrubfowl)
 M. c. gilbertii Gray 1862 (Sulawesi megapode)
 M. c. sanghirensis Schlegel 1880
 M. c. talautensis Roselaar 1994
 New Guinea scrubfowl, Megapodius decollatus Oustalet 1878 
 Melanesian megapode, Megapodius eremita Hartlaub 1868 
 Dusky megapode, Megapodius freycinet Gaimard 1823 
 M. f. quoyii Gray 1862 (Quoy's megapode)
 M. f. freycinet  Gaimard 182
 M. f. oustaleti Roselaar 1994 (Oustalet's megapode)
 Forsten's megapode, Megapodius forstenii Gray 1847 
 M. f. forsteni Gray 1847
 M. f. buruensis Stresemann 1914
 Biak scrubfowl Megapodius geelvinkianus Meyer 1874  C2a(ii)
 Micronesian megapode, Megapodius laperouse Gaimard 1823  B1ab(ii,iii,iv,v)
 M. l. laperouse Gaimard 1823 (Marianas Island megapode)
 M. l. senex Hartlaub 1868 (Palau Island megapode)
 Vanuatu megapode, Megapodius layardi Tristram 1879  C2a(i)
 Nicobar megapode, Megapodius nicobariensis Blyth 1846  C2a(i);D1
 M. n. nicobariensis Blyth 1846
 M. n. abbotti Oberholser 1919
 Tongan megapode, Megapodius pritchardii Gray 1864  B1ab(v)+2ab(v)
 Orange-footed scrubfowl Megapodius reinwardt Dumont 1823 
 M. r. reinwardt Dumont 1823 (Papuan orange-footed scrubfowl)
 M. r. macgillivrayi Gray 1862
 M. r. tumulus Gould 1842 (western orange-footed scrubfowl)
 M. r. yorki Mathews 1929 (Cape York orange-footed scrubfowl)
 M. r. castanonotus Mayr 1938 (Southern Queensland orange-footed scrubfowl)
 Tanimbar megapode Megapodius tenimberensis Sclater 1883

Family Cracidae Rafinesque, 1815

 Genus †Archaealectrornis Crowe & Short 1992
 †Archaealectrornis sibleyi Crowe & Short 1992
 Genus †Boreortalis Brodkorb 1954
 †Boreortalis laesslei Brodkorb 1954
 Genus †Palaeonossax Wetmore 1956
 †Palaeonossax senectus Wetmore 1956
 Subfamily Penelopinae  (guans)
 Genus Aburria Reichenbach 1853
 Subgenus (Aburria)
 Wattled guan, Aburria aburri (Lesson 1828) Reichenbach 1853 
 Subgenus (Pipile) Bonaparte 1856 (piping guans)
 Black-fronted piping guan, Aburria jacutinga (von Spix 1825)  A2cd+3 cd+4 cd
 Red-throated piping guan, Aburria cujubi (Pelzeln 1858) 
 A. c. cujubi (Pelzeln 1858) (Stripe-crowned/Amazonian piping guan)
 A. c. nattereri Reichenbach 1861 (Natterer's Piping Guan)
 Trinidad piping guan, Aburria pipile (Jacquin 1784)  C2a(i,ii)
 Blue-throated piping guan, Aburria cumanensis (Jacquin 1784) 
 A. c. cumanensis (Jacquin 1784) (White-headed/Venezuelan blue-throated piping guan)
 A. c. grayi (Pelzeln 1870) (Gray's/white-throated piping guan) 
 Genus Chamaepetes Wagler 1832
 Black guan, Chamaepetes unicolor Salvin 1867 
 Sickle-winged guan, Chamaepetes goudotii (Lesson 1828) 
 C. g. sanctaemarthae Chapman 1912 (Santa Marta sickle-winged guan)
 C. g. fagani Chubb 1917 (Fagan's sickle-winged guan)
 C. g. tschudii Taczanowski 1886 (Tschudi's sickle-winged guan)
 C. g. rufiventris (Tschudi 1843) (rufous-bellied sickle-winged guan)
 C. g. goudotii (Lesson 1828) (Goudot's sickle-winged guan)
 Genus Penelope Merrem 1786 (15 species)
 Penelope argyrotis (Bonaparte 1856) (Band-tailed Guan) 
 P. a. albicauda Phelps & Gilliard 1940
 P. a. argyrotis (Bonaparte 1856) (rufous/bar-tailed guan)
 P. a. colombiana Todd 1912 (Santa Marta guan)
 Penelope barbata Chapman 1921 (Bearded Guan)  B1ab(i,ii,iii,v)
 Penelope ortoni Salvin 1874 (Baudo Guan)  A2cd+3 cd+4 cd
 Penelope montagnii (Bonaparte 1856) (Andean Guan) 
 P. m. montagnii (Bonaparte 1856) (Montagne's guan)
 P. m. atrogularis Hellmayr & Conover 1932 (black-throated guan)
 P. m. brooki Chubb 1917 (Brook's guan)
 P. m. plumosa von Berlepsch & Stolzmann 1902 (Peruvian guan)
 P. m. sclateri Gray 1860 (Sclater's guan)
 Penelope marail (Müller 1776) (Marail Guan) 
 P. m. jacupeba von Spix 1825
 P. m. marail (Müller 1776) (Marail/Cayenne guan)
 Penelope superciliaris Temminck 1815 (Rusty-margined Guan) 
 P. s. superciliaris Temminck 1815 (superciliated guan)
 P. s. jacupemba von Spix 1825 (Spix's Brazilian guan)
 P. s. major Bertoni 1901 (Paraguayan guan)
 Penelope dabbenei Hellmayr & Conover 1942 (Red-faced/Dabbene's Guan) 
 Penelope purpurascens Wagler 1830 (Crested Guan) 
 P. p. purpurascens Wagler 1830 (purple guan)
 P. p. aequatorialis Salvadori & Festa 1900 (equatorial guan)
 P. p. brunnescens Hellmayr & Conover 1932 (brownish guan)
 Penelope perspicax Bangs 1911 (Cauca Guan)  B1ab(i,ii,iii,v)
 Penelope albipennis Taczanowski 1878 (White-winged Guan)  C2a(i)
 Penelope jacquacu von Spix 1825 (Spix's Guan) 
 P. j. granti von Berlepsch 1908 (Green-backed/Ogilvie-Grant's Guan)
 P. j. orienticola Todd 1932
 P. j. jacquacu (Spix's/crested Guan)
 P. j. speciosa Todd 1915 (Bolivian guan)
 Penelope obscura Temminck 1815 (Dusky-legged Guan) 
 P. o. obscura Temminck 1815 (Dusky/obscure guan)
 P. o. bronzina Hellmayr 1914 (Bronze-green guan)
 P. o. bridgesi Gray 1860 (Bridges's Guan)
 Penelope pileata Wagler 1830 (White-crested Guan)  A3c
 Penelope ochrogaster Pelzeln 1870 (Chestnut-bellied Guan)  B1ab(i,ii,iii,iv,v);C2a(i);D1
 Penelope jacucaca von Spix 1825 (White-browed Guan)  A2cd+3 cd+4 cd
 Genus Penelopina Reichenbach 1861
 Highland guan, Penelopina nigra (Fraser 1852) Reichenbach 1861  A2cd+3 cd+4 cd
 Subfamily Cracinae
 Tribe Ortalidini Donegan 2012
 Genus Ortalis Merrem 1786 (chachalacas, 12 species)
 †Ortalis affinis Feduccia & Wilson 1967 
 †Ortalis phengites Wetmore 1923
 †Ortalis pollicaris Miller 1944
 †Ortalis tantala Wetmore 1933
 Ortalis vetula (Wagler 1830) (Plain chachalaca) 
 O. v. mccalli Baird 1858 (Texan chachalaca)
 O. v. vetula (Wagler 1830) (lesser gray-headed chachalaca)
 O. v. pallidiventris Ridgway 1887 (pale-bellied chachalaca)
 O. v. deschauenseei Bond 1936 (Utila Island chachalaca)
 Ortalis cinereiceps Gray 1867 (Grey-headed chachalaca) 
 Ortalis garrula (von Humboldt 1805) (Chestnut-winged chachalaca) 
 Ortalis ruficauda Jardine 1847 (Rufous-vented Chachalaca) 
 O. r. ruficrissa Sclater & Salvin 1870 (Rufous-vented chachalaca)
 O. r. ruficauda Jardine 1847 (Rufous-tipped/Jardine's chachalaca)
 Ortalis erythroptera Sclater & Salvin 1870 (Rufous-headed chachalaca)  B1ab(i,ii,iii,v)
 Ortalis wagleri Gray 1867 (Rufous-bellied chachalaca) 
 Ortalis poliocephala (Wagler 1830) (West Mexican Chachalaca) 
 Ortalis canicollis (Wagler 1830) (Chaco chachalaca) 
 O. c. canicollis (Wagler 1830) (hoary-necked guan)
 O. c. pantanalensis Cherrie & Reichenberger 1921 (Pantanal chachalaca)
 Ortalis leucogastra (Gould 1843) (White-bellied chachalaca) 
 Ortalis guttata (von Spix 1825) (Speckled chachalaca) 
 O. g. subaffinis Todd 1932 (Bolivian chachalaca)
 O. g. guttata (von Spix 1825) (spotted chachalaca)
 Ortalis columbiana Hellmayr 1906 (Colombian chachalaca) 
 Ortalis araucuan (von Spix 1825) (East Brazilian chachalaca) 
 Ortalis squamata Lesson 1829 (Scaled chachalaca) 
 Ortalis motmot (Linnaeus 1766) (Little/variable/Guiana chachalaca) 
 Ortalis ruficeps (Wagler 1830) (Chestnut-headed chachalaca) 
 Ortalis superciliaris Gray 1867 (Buff-browed chachalaca) 
 Tribe Oreophasini Bonaparte 1853
 Genus Oreophasis Gray 1844
 Horned guan, Oreophasis derbianus Gray 1844  C2a(i)
 Tribe Cracini Rafinesque 1815 (curassows)
 Genus Crax Linnaeus 1758 (7 species)
 Crax rubra Linnaeus 1758 (Great curassow)  A2cd+3 cd+4 cd
 C. r. rubra Linnaeus 1758 (Red/Central American curassow)
 C. r. griscomi Nelson 1926 (Cozumel great curassow)
 Crax alberti Fraser 1852 (Prince Albert's/Blue-billed/knobbed curassow)  A3bcd
 Crax daubentoni Gray 1867 (Yellow-knobbed curassow) 
 Crax globulosa von Spix 1825 (Globulose/Wattled/Yarrell's curassow)  A2d+3d+4d;C2a(i)
 Crax blumenbachii von Spix 1825 (Red-billed curassow)  B1ab(i,ii,iii,v);C2a(i);D
 Crax alector Linnaeus 1766 (Black curassow)  A3c
 C. a. alector Linnaeus 1766
 C. a. erythrognatha Sclater & Salvin 1877
 Crax fasciolata von Spix 1825 (Bare-faced curassow)  A4c
 C. f. pinima Pelzeln 1870 (Belem/Natterer's curassow)  D
 C. f. grayi Ogilvie-Grant 1893 (Gray's curassow)
 C. f. fasciolata von Spix 1825 (Fasciated/Sclater's curassow)
 Genus Mitu Lesson 1831 (razor-billed curassows)
 Crestless curassow, Mitu tomentosum (von Spix 1825) 
 Salvin's curassow, Mitu salvini Reinhardt 1879 
 Razor-billed curassow, Mitu tuberosum (von Spix 1825) 
 Alagoas curassow, Mitu mitu (Linnaeus 1766) 
 Genus Nothocrax Burmeister 1856
 Nocturnal curassow, Nothocrax urumutum (von Spix 1825) Burmeister 1856 
 Genus Pauxi Temminck 1813 (helmeted curassows)
 Horned curassow, Pauxi unicornis Bond & Meyer de Schauensee 1939  A2bcd+3 cd+4bcd
 Sira curassow, Pauxi koepckeae Weske & Terborgh 1971  C2a(i,ii)
 Helmeted curassow, Pauxi pauxi (Linnaeus 1766) Temminck 1813  C2a(i)
 P. p. gilliardi Wetmore & Phelps 1943 (Perijá helmeted curassow)
 P. p. pauxi (Linnaeus 1766) (Mérida helmeted curassow)

Family Numididae de Selys Longchamps, 1842

 Genus Guttera Wagler 1832
 Plumed guineafowl, Guttera plumifera (Cassin 1857) 
 G. p. plumifera (Cassin 1857) (Cameroon plumed guineafowl)
 G. p. schubotzi Reichenow 1912 (Schubotz's/Uele River plummed guineafowl)
 Crested guineafowl, Guttera pucherani (Hartlaub 1861) 
 G. p. pucherani (Hartlaub 1861) (Kenya/East African crested guineafowl)
 G. p. verreauxi (Elliot 1870) (Lindi crested guineafowl)
 G. p. sclateri Reichenow 1898 (Sclater's crested guineafowl)
 G. p. barbata Ghigi 1905 (Malawi/Mozambique crested guineafowl)
 G. p. edouardi (Hartlaub 1867) (Zambesi/Natal crested guineafowl)
 Genus Numida Linnaeus 1764
 Helmeted guineafowl, Numida meleagris (Linnaeus 1758) Linnaeus 1764 
 †N. m. sabyi Hartert 1919 (Moroccan/Saby's helmeted guineafowl)
 N. m. galeatus Pallas 1767 (West African helmeted guineafowl)
 N. m. meleagris (Linnaeus 1758) (Saharan helmeted guineafowl)
 N. m. somaliensis Neumann 1899 (Somali tufted guineafowl)
 N. m. reichenowi Ogilvie-Grant 1894 (East African/Reichenow's helmeted guineafowl)
 N. m. mitratus (Pallas 1764) (Coast tufted guineafowl)
 N. m. marungensis Schalow 1884 (Marungu helmeted guineafowl)
 N. m. papillosus Reichenow 1894 (Damara/wattle-nosed helmeted guineafowl)
 N. m. coronatus Gurney 1868 (Natal helmeted guineafowl)
 Genus Acryllium Gray 1840
 Vulturine guineafowl, Acryllium vulturinum (Hardwicke 1834) Gray 1840 
 Genus Agelastes Bonaparte 1850
 White-breasted guineafowl, Agelastes meleagrides Bonaparte 1850  A2cd+3 cd+4 cd
 Black guineafowl, Agelastes niger (Cassin 1857)

Family Odontophoridae Gould, 1844

 Genus †Miortyx Miller 1944
 †Miortyx teres Miller 1944
 †Miortyx aldeni Howard 1966
 Genus †Nanortyx Weigel 1963
 †Nanortyx inexpectatus Weigel 1963
 Genus †Neortyx Holman 1961
 †Neortyx peninsularis Holman 1961
 Subfamily Ptilopachinae Bowie, Coehn & Crowe 2013
 Genus Ptilopachus Swainson 1837
 Nahan's partridge, Ptilopachus nahani (Dubois 1905)  B2ab(ii,iii,v)
 Stone partridge, Ptilopachus petrosus (Gmelin 1789) 
 P. p. brehmi Neumann 1908 (Kordofan stone partridge)
 P. p. major Neumann 1908 (Abyssinian/Ethiopian stone partridge)
 P. p. florentiae Ogilvie-Grant 1900 (Kenya stone partridge)
 P. p. petrosus (Gmelin 1789)
 Subfamily Odontophorinae Gould 1844 (New World quails)
 Genus Rhynchortyx Ogilvie-Grant 1893
 Tawny-faced quail, Rhynchortyx cinctus (Salvin 1876) Ogilvie-Grant 1893 
 R. c. pudibundus Peters 1929 (Honduran long-legged colin)
 R. c. cinctus (Salvin 1876) (long-legged colin)
 R. c. australis Chapman 1915 (southern long-legged colin)
 Genus Oreortyx (Douglas 1829) Baird 1858
 Mountain quail, Oreortyx pictus (Douglas 1829) Baird 1858 
 O. p. pictus (Douglas 1829) non Peters (northwestern mountain quail)
 O. p. plumifer (Gould 1837) (plumed mountain quail)
 O. p. russelli Miller 1946 (pallid mountain quail)
 O. p. eremophilus van Rossem 1937 (desert mountain quail)
 O. p. confinis Anthony 1889 (southern mountain quail)
 Genus Dendrortyx Gould 1844
 Bearded wood partridge, Dendrortyx barbatus Gould 1846  A2cd+3 cd+4 cd;B1ab(i,ii,iii,v);C2a(i)
 Buffy-crowned wood partridge, Dendrortyx leucophrys (Gould 1844) 
 D. l. leucophrys (Gould 1844) (Guatemalan/Nicaraguan long-tailed partridge)
 D. l. hypospodius Salvin 1896 (Costa Rican long-tailed partridge)
 Long-tailed wood partridge, Dendrortyx macroura (Jardine & Selby 1828) 
 D. m. macroura (Jardine & Selby 1828) (eastern long-tailed partridge)
 D. m. griseipectus Nelson 1897 (gray-breasted long-tailed partridge)
 D. m. diversus Friedmann 1943 (Jalisco long-tailed partridge)
 D. m. striatus Nelson 1897 (Guerreran long-tailed partridge)
 D. m. inesperatus Phillips 1966
 D. m. oaxacae Nelson 1897 (Oaxacan long-tailed partridge)
 Genus Philortyx Gould 1846 non Des Murs 1854
 Banded quail, Philortyx fasciatus (Gould 1844) Gould 1846 
 Genus Colinus Goldfuss 1820 (Bobwhites)
 †Colinus eatoni Shufeldt, 1915
 †Colinus suilium Brodkorb 1959
 †Colinus hibbardi Wetmore 1944
 Crested bobwhite, Colinus cristatus (Linnaeus 1766) 
 C. c. mariae Wetmore 1962
 C. c. panamensis Dickey & van Rossem 1930 (Panama crested quail)
 C. c. decoratus (Todd 1917) (Magdalena crested quail)
 C. c. littoralis (Todd 1917) (littoral crested quail)
 C. c. cristatus (Linnaeus 1766)
 C. c. horvathi (Madarász 1904) (Horvath's quail)
 C. c. barnesi Gilliard 1940
 C. c. sonnini (Temminck 1815) (Sonnini's crested quail)
 C. c. mocquerysi (Hartert 1894) (Mocquerys's/Cumana crested quail)
 C. c. leucotis (Gould 1844) (white-eared crested quail)
 C. c. badius Conover 1938 (Cauca Valley crested quail)
 C. c. bogotensis Dugand 1943 (Bogotá crested bobwhite)
 C. c. parvicristatus (Gould 1843) (short-crested quail)
 Spot-bellied bobwhite, Colinus leucopogon (Lesson 1842) 
 C. l. incanus Friedmann 1944 (Guatemalan white-breasted bobwhite)
 C. l. hypoleucus (Gould 1860) (Salvadorean White-breasted Bobwhite)
 C. l. leucopogon (Lesson 1842) (white-throated quail)
 C. l. leylandi (Moore 1859) (Leyland's spot-bellied quail)
 C. l. sclateri (Bonaparte 1856) (Sclater's spot-bellied bobwhite)
 C. l. dickeyi Conover 1932 (Dickey's spot-bellied bobwhite)
 Black-throated bobwhite, Colinus nigrogularis (Gould 1843) 
 C. n. caboti van Tyne & Trautman 1941
 C. n. persiccus van Tyne & Trautman 1941 (Progreso black-throated bobwhite)
 C. n. nigrogularis (Gould 1843) 
 C. n. segoviensis Ridgway 1888 (Honduran black-throated quail)
 Northern bobwhite, Colinus virginianus  (Linnaeus 1758) 
 C. v. graysoni subspecies-group
 C. v. graysoni (Lawrence 1867) (Grayson's Bobwhite)
 C. v. nigripectus Nelson 1897 (puebla northern bobwhite)
 C. v. pectoralis subspecies-group
 C. v. pectoralis (Gould 1843) (black-breasted bobwhite)
 C. v. godmani Nelson 1897 (Godman's northern bobwhite)
 C. v. minor Nelson 1901 (least northern bobwhite)
 C. v. thayeri Bangs & Peters 1928 (Thayer's northern bobwhite)
 C. v. coyolcos subspecies-group
 C. v. nelsoni (Nelson's bobwhite
 C. v. ridgwayi Brewster 1885 (Masked northern Bobwhite)
 C. v. insignis Nelson 1897 (Guatemalan northern bobwhite)
 C. v. salvini Nelson 1897 (Salvin's northern bobwhite)
 C. v. coyolcos (Statius Müller 1776) (coyolcos Bobwhite)
 C. v. harrisoni Orr & Webster 1968 (Harrison's bobwhite)
 C. v. atriceps (Ogilvie-Grant 1893) (black-headed northern bobwhite)
 C. v. virginianus subspecies-group 
 C. v. aridus (Lawrence 1853) Aldrich 1942 (Jaumave northern bobwhite)
 C. v. cubanensis (Gray 1846) (Cuban bobwhite)
 C. v. floridanus (Coues 1872) (Florida bobwhite)
 C. v. maculatus Nelson 1899 (spot-bellied northern bobwhite)
 C. v. virginianus (Linnaeus 1758) (Eastern bobwhite)
 C. v. taylori Lincoln 1915 (plains bobwhite)
 C. v. texanus (Lawrence 1853) (Texas bobwhite)
 Genus Callipepla Wagler 1832 (Crested quails)
 †Callipepla shotwelli (Brodkorb 1958)
 Scaled quail/blue quail Callipepla squamata (Vigors 1830) 
 C. s. pallida Brewster 1881 (northern scaled quail)
 C. s. hargravei Rea 1973 (Upper Sonoran scaled quail)
 C. s. castanogastris Brewster 1883 (chestnut-bellied scaled quail)
 C. s. squamata (Vigors 1830) (Altiplano scaled quail)
 Elegant quail, Callipepla douglasii (Vigors 1829) 
 C. d. douglasii (Vigors 1829) (Douglas's elegant quail)
 C. d. bensoni Ridgway 1887 (Benson's elegant quail)
 C. d. vanderbilti  (Islas Marías elegant quail)
 C. d. teres (Friedmann 1943) (Jalisco elegant quail)
 California quail, Callipepla californica (Shaw 1798) 
 C. c. brunnescens (Ridgway 1884) (coastal California quail)
 C. c. canfieldae (van Rossem 1939) (Owen Valley quail)
 C. c. californica (Shaw 1798) (valley California quail)
 C. c. catalinensis (Grinnell 1906) (Santa Catalina California quail)
 C. c. achrustera (Peters 1923) (San Lucas California quail)
 Gambel's quail, Callipepla gambelii (Gambel 1843) 
 C. g. gambelii (Gambel 1843) (southwestern Gambel's quail)
 C. g. ignoscens Friedmann 1943 (Texas Gambel's quail)
 C. g. fulvipectus Nelson 1899 (fulvous-breasted Gambel's quail)
 C. g. stephensi Phillips 1959 (Stephen's Gambel's quail)
 Genus Cyrtonyx Gould 1844
 †Cyrtonyx cooki Wetmore, 1934
 Ocellated quail, Cyrtonyx ocellatus (Gould 1837)  A3cd
 Montezuma quail, Cyrtonyx montezumae (Vigors 1830) 
 C. m. mearnsi Nelson 1900 (Mearns's Montezuma quail)
 C. m. montezumae (Vigors 1830) (Massena harlequin quail)
 C. m. rowleyi Phillips 1966
 C. m. sallei Verreaux 1859 (Salle's Montezuma/spot-breasted quail) 
 Genus Dactylortyx (Gambel 1848)Ogilvie-Grant 1893
 Singing quail, Dactylortyx thoracicus (Gambel 1848) Ogilvie-Grant 1893 
 D. t. pettingilli Warner & Harrell 1957
 D. t. thoracicus (Gambel 1848) (Veracruz singing quail)
 D. t. sharpei Nelson 1903 (Yucatán singing quail)
 D. t. paynteri Warner & Harrell 1955
 D. t. devius Nelson 1898 (Jaliscan singing quail)
 D. t. melodus Warner & Harrell 1957
 D. t. chiapensis Nelson 1898 (Chiapan singing quail)
 D. t. dolichonyx Warner & Harrell 1957 [Dactylortyx thoracicus calophonus]
 D. t. salvadoranus Dickey & van Rossem 1928 (Salvadorean long-toed partridge)
 D. t. fuscus Conover 1937 (Honduran long-toed partridge)
 D. t. conoveri Warner & Harrell 1957
 Genus Odontophorus Vieillot 1816 (wood quails)
 Spotted wood quail, Odontophorus guttatus (Gould 1838) 
 Marbled wood quail, Odontophorus gujanensis (Gmelin 1789) 
 O. g. castigatus Bangs 1901 (Chiriquí partridge)
 O. g. marmoratus (Gould 1843) (marbled partridge)
 O. g. medius Chapman 1929 (Duida partridge)
 O. g. gujanensis (Gmelin 1789) (Guianan partridge)
 O. g. buckleyi Chubb 1919 (Buckley's partridge)
 O. g. rufogularis Blake 1959
 O. g. pachyrhynchus Tschudi 1844 (thick-billed partridge)
 O. g. simonsi Chubb 1919 (Simon's partridge)
 Starred wood quail, Odontophorus stellatus (Gould 1843) 
 Spot-winged wood quail, Odontophorus capueira (von Spix 1825) 
 Black-eared wood quail, Odontophorus melanotis Salvin 1865 
 O. m. verecundus Peters 1929 (Honduran partridge)
 O. m. melanotis Salvin 1865 (black-eared wood quail)
 Rufous-fronted wood quail, Odontophorus erythrops Gould 1859 
 O. e. parambae Rothschild 1897 (Paramba quail)
 O. e. erythrops Gould 1859 (chestnut-eared partridge)
 Stripe-faced wood quail, Odontophorus balliviani Gould 1846 
 Chestnut wood quail, Odontophorus hyperythrus Gould 1858 
 Dark-backed wood quail, Odontophorus melanonotus Gould 1861  B1ab(i,ii,iii,v)
 Rufous-breasted wood quail, Odontophorus speciosus Tschudi 1843 
 O. s. soderstromii Lönnberg & Rendahl 1922 (Soderstrom's partridge)
 O. s. speciosus Tschudi 1843 (rufous-breasted partridge)
 O. s. loricatus Todd 1932 (Bolivian partridge)
 Tacarcuna wood quail, Odontophorus dialeucos Wetmore 1963  D2
 Gorgeted wood quail, Odontophorus strophium (Gould 1844)  B1ab(i,ii,iii,v)
 Venezuelan wood quail, Odontophorus columbianus Gould 1850 
 Black-breasted wood quail, Odontophorus leucolaemus Salvin 1867 
 Black-fronted wood quail, Odontophorus atrifrons Allen 1900  B1ab(i,ii,iii,v)
 O. a. atrifrons Allen 1900 (black-fronted partridge)
 O. a. variegatus Todd 1919 (variegated partridge)
 O. a. navai Aveledo & Pons 1952

Family Phasianidae Horsfield, 1821

Phasianidae incertae sedis
 †“Alectoris” pliocaena Tugarinov 1940b
 †“Gallus” beremendensis Jánossy 1976b
 †“Gallus” europaeus Harrison 1978
 Genus †Bantamyx Kuročkin 1982
 †Bantamyx georgicus Kuročkin 1982
 Genus †Diangallus Hou 1985
 †Diangallus mious Hou 1985
 Genus †Lophogallus Zelenkov & Kuročkin 2010
 †Lophogallus naranbulakensis Zelenkov & Kuročkin 2010
 Genus †Megalocoturnix Sánchez Marco 2009
 †Megalocoturnix cordoni Sánchez Marco 2009
 Genus †Miophasianus Brodkorb 1952 [Miophasianus Lambrecht 1933 nomen nudum; Miogallus Lambrecht 1933]
 †M. altus (Milne-Edwards 1869) Lambrecht 1933
 †M. maxima (Lydekker 1893) Brodkorb 1964
 †M. medius (Milne-Edwards 1869) Lambrecht 1933
 Genus †Palaeocryptonyx Depéret 1892 [Chauvireria Boev 1997; Pliogallus Tugarinov 1940b non Gaillard 1939; Lambrechtia Janossy 1974]
 †P. donnezani Depéret 1892
 †P. edwardsi (Depéret 1887) Ballmann 1969a
 †P. grivensis Ennouchi 1930
 †P. minor (Jánossy 1974)
 †P. novaki Sánchez Marco 2009
 †P. subfrancolinus (Jánossy 1976b)
 Genus †Palaeortyx Milne-Edwards 1869 [Palaeoperdix Milne-Edwards 1869]
 †P. brevipes Milne-Edwards 1869 emend. Paris 1912
 †P. gallica Milne-Edwards 1869 non Lydekker 1891
 †P. joleaudi Ennouchi 1930
 †P. media Milne-Edwards 1871 nomen nudum
 †P. phasianoides Milne-Edwards 1869
 †P. prisca (Milne-Edwards 1869)
 †P. volans Göhlich & Pavia 2008
 Genus †Plioperdix Kretzoi 1955 [Pliogallus Tugarinov 1940 nec Gaillard 1939]
 †P. africana Mourer-Chauviré & Geraads 2010
 †P. crassipes (Gaillard 1939)
 †P. hungarica (Jánossy 1991) Zelenkov & Panteleyev 2014
 †P. kormosi (Gaillard 1939)
 Genus †Rustaviornis Burchak-Abramovich & Meladze 1972
 †Rustaviornis georgicus Burchak-Abramovich & Meladze 1972
 Genus †Schaubortyx Brodkorb 1964
 †Schaubortyx keltica (Eastman 1905) Brodkorb 1964
 Genus †Shandongornis Yeh 1997
 †S. shanwanensis Yeh 1997
 †S. yinansis Hou 2003
 Genus †Shanxiornis Wang et al. 2006
 †Shanxiornis fenyinis Wang et al. 2006
 Genus †Tologuica Zelenkov & Kuročkin 2009
 †T. aurorae Zelenkov & Kuročkin 2009
 †T. karhui Zelenkov & Kuročkin 2009

Subfamily Rollulinae

 Genus Melanoperdix Jerdon 1864
 Black wood-partridge, Melanoperdix nigra (Vigors 1829) Jerdon 1864  A2c+3c+4c
 Genus Rhizothera Gray 1841
 Long-billed partridge, Rhizothera longirostris (Temminck 1815) 
 Dulit partridge, Rhizothera dulitensis Ogilvie-Grant 1895  C2a(i)
 Genus Xenoperdix Dinesen et al. 1994
 Rubeho forest partridge, Xenoperdix obscuratus Fjeldså & Kiure 2003
 Udzungwa forest partridge, Xenoperdix udzungwensis Dinesen et al. 1994  B1ab(v)
 Genus Rollulus Bonnaterre 1791
 Crested partridge, Rollulus roulroul (Scopoli 1786) Bonnaterre 1791 
 Genus Caloperdix Blyth 1861
 Ferruginous partridge, Caloperdix oculea (Temminck 1815) Blyth 1861 
 C. o. oculeus (Temminck 1815) Blyth 1861
 C. o. ocellatus (Raffles 1822)
 C. o. borneensis Ogilvie-Grant 1892
 Genus Arborophila Hodgson 1837, hill partridges
 Necklaced hill partridge, Arborophila torqueola (Valenciennes 1825) 
 A. t. millardi (Baker 1921) (Simla/Indian hill partridge)
 A. t. torqueola (Valenciennes 1825) (common hill partridge)
 A. t. interstincta Ripley 1951
 A. t. batemani (Ogilvie-Grant 1906)
 A. t. griseata Delacour & Jabouille 1930
 Rufous-throated partridge, Arborophila rufogularis (Blyth 1849) 
 A. r. rufogularis (Blyth 1849) (Blyth's hill partridge)
 A. r. intermedia (Blyth 1855) (Arrakan hill-partridge)
 A. r. tickelli (Hume 1880) (Tickell's rufous-throated partridge)
 A. r. euroa (Bangs & Phillips, JC 1914)
 A. r. guttata Delacour & Jabouille 1928
 A. r. annamensis (Robinson & Kloss 1919)
 White-cheeked partridge, Arborophila atrogularis (Blyth 1849) 
 Taiwan partridge, Arborophila crudigularis (Swinhoe 1864) 
 Chestnut-breasted partridge, Arborophila mandellii Hume 1874  C2a(i)
 Bar-backed partridge, Arborophila brunneopectus (Blyth 1855)  
 A. b. brunneopectus (Blyth 1855)
 A. b. henrici (Oustalet 1896)
 A. b. albigula (Robinson & Kloss 1919)
 Sichuan partridge, Arborophila rufipectus Boulton 1932  C2a(i)
 White-necklaced partridge, Arborophila gingica (Gmelin 1789) 
 A. g. gingica (Gmelin 1789) (Fujian white-necklaced/Fokien hill partridge)
 A. g. guangxiensis Zhou, F & Jiang 2008 (Guangxi white-necklaced partridge)
 Orange-necked partridge, Arborophila davidi Delacour 1927 
 Chestnut-headed partridge, Arborophila cambodiana Delacour & Jabouille 1928 
 A. c. cambodiana Delacour & Jabouille 1928
 A. c. chandamonyi Eames, Steinheimer & Bansok 2002
 Siamese partridge, Arborophila diversa Riley 1930
 Malaysian/Campbell's partridge Arborophila campbelli (Robinson 1904) 
 Roll's partridge, Arborophila rolli (Rothschild 1909) 
 Sumatran partridge, Arborophila sumatrana Ogilvie-Grant 1891 
 Grey-breasted partridge, Arborophila orientalis (Horsfield 1821)  A2cd+3 cd+4 cd;B1ab(ii,iii,v)
 Chestnut-bellied partridge, Arborophila javanica (Gmelin 1789) 
 A. j. javanica (Gmelin 1789)
 A. j. lawuana Bartels 1938
 Red-breasted partridge, Arborophila hyperythra (Sharpe 1879) 
 A. h. hyperythra (Sharpe 1879) (Red-breasted Partridge)
 A. h. erythrophrys Sharpe 1890 (Kinabalu Partridge)
 Red-billed partridge, Arborophila rubrirostris (Salvadori 1879) 
 Hainan partridge, Arborophila ardens (Styan 1892)  A2cd;B1ab(ii,iii,iv,v);C2a(i)

Subfamily Phasianinae
 Genus Tropicoperdix Blyth 1859
 Chestnut-necklaced partridge, Tropicoperdix charltonii Eyton 1845  C2a(i)
 T. c. charltonii (Eyton 1845)
 T. c. atjenensis Meyer de Schauensee & Ripley 1940
 T. c. graydoni (Sharpe & Chubb 1906) (Sabah partridge) 
 Green-legged partridge, Tropicoperdix chloropus Blyth 1859 
 T. c. chloropus Blyth 1859 (Scaly-breasted partridge)
 T. c. tonkinensis (Delacour, 1927) 
 T. c. cognacqi Delacour & Jabouille 1924
 T. c. merlini Delacour & Jabouille 1924 (Annam/Vietnam partridge)
 T. c. vivida (Delacour, 1926)
 T. c. peninsularis (Meyer de Schauensee 1941)
 T. c. olivacea Delacour & Jabouille 1928

 Tribe Coturnicini Bonaparte 1854 (Old World Partridges & Quail, Spurfowl)
 Genus Ammoperdix Gould 1851
 See-see partridge, Ammoperdix griseogularis (von Brandt 1843) 
 Sand partridge, Ammoperdix heyi (Temminck 1825) 
 A. h. heyi (Temminck 1825) (Sinai sand partridge; Palestine seesee)
 A. h. nicolli Hartert 1919 (North Egyptian sand partridge)
 A. h. cholmleyi Ogilvie-Grant 1897 (South Egyptian sand partridge)
 A. h. intermedius Hartert 1917 (Arabian seesee)
Genus Synoicus Bosc 1792
Brown quail, Synoicus ypsilophora Bosc 1792 
 S. y. raaltenii (Müller 1842)
 S. y. pallidior (Hartert 1897)
 S. y. saturatior (Hartert 1930)
 S. y. dogwa (Mayr & Rand 1935)
 S. y. plumbea (Salvadori 1894)
 S. y. monticola (Mayr & Rand 1935)
 S. y. mafulu (Mayr & Rand 1935)
 S. y. australis (Latham 1801)
 S. y. ypsilophora Bosc 1792 (Tasmanian brown quail)
Blue quail, Synoicus adansonii (Verreaux & Verreaux 1851) 
 King quail, Synoicus chinensis (Linnaeus 1766) 
 E. c. chinensis (Linnaeus 1766) (Chinese blue-breasted quail)
 E. c. trinkutensis Richmond 1902 (Nicobar blue-breasted quail)
 E. c. lineata (Scopoli 1786)
 E. c. novaeguineae Rand 1941
 E. c. papuensis Mayr & Rand 1936
 E. c. lepida Hartlaub 1879
 E. c. australis Gould 1865 (eastern king quail)
 E. c. colletti Mathews 1912 (western king quail)
 Snow Mountain quail, Synoicus monorthonyx van Oort 1910 
 Genus Margaroperdix Reichenbach 1853
 Madagascan partridge, Margaroperdix madagascarensis (Scopoli 1786) Reichenbach 1853 
 Genus Coturnix Garsault 1764 
 †Canary Islands quail, Coturnix gomerae Jaume, McMinn & Alcover 1993
 Common quail, Coturnix coturnix (Linnaeus 1758) 
  C. c. coturnix (Linnaeus 1758) (Eurasian Common Quail)
 C. c. conturbans Hartert 1917 (Azores quail)
 C. c. inopinata Hartert 1917 (Cape Verde quail)
 C. c. africana Temminck & Schlegel 1849 (African quail)
 C. c. erlangeri Zedlitz 1912 (Abyssinian quail)
 Japanese quail, Coturnix japonica Temminck & Schlegel 1849 
 Stubble quail, Coturnix pectoralis Gould 1837 
 †New Zealand quail, Coturnix novaezelandiae Quoy & Gaimard 1832 
 Rain quail, Coturnix coromandelica (Gmelin 1789) 
 Harlequin quail, Coturnix delegorguei Delegorgue 1847 
 C. d. delegorguei Delegorgue 1847 (African/Delegorgue harlequin quail)
 C. d. histrionica Hartlaub 1849 (São Tomé harlequin quail)
 C. d. arabica Bannerman 1929 (Arabian harlequin quail)
 Genus Tetraogallus Gray 1832 (Snowcocks)
 Caucasian Snowcock, Tetraogallus caucasicus (Pallas 1811) 
 Caspian Snowcock, Tetraogallus caspius (Gmelin 1784) 
 T. c. tauricus Dresser 1876 (western Caspian snowcock)
 T. c. caspius (Gmelin, SG 1784) (eastern Caspian snowcock)
 T. c. semenowtianschanskii Zarudny 1908
 Tibetan Snowcock, Tetraogallus tibetanus Gould 1854 
 T. t. tschimenensis Sushkin 1926
 T. t. tibetanus Gould 1854
  T. t. aquilonifer Meinertzhagen & Meinertzhagen 1926
 T. t. yunnanensis Yang & Xu 1987
 T. t. henrici Oustalet 1892
 T. t. przewalskii Bianchi 1907
 Altai Snowcock, Tetraogallus altaicus (Gebler 1836) 
 Himalayan Snowcock, Tetraogallus himalayensis Gray 1843 
 T. h. sauricus Potapov 1993
 T. h. sewerzowi Zarudny 1910
 T. h. incognitus Zarudny 1911
 T. h. himalayensis Gray 1843
 T. h. grombczewskii Bianchi 1898
 T. h. koslowi Bianchi 1898
 Genus Alectoris Kaup, 1829  (rock partridges)
 †Alectoris bavarica Ballmann, 1969
 †Alectoris peii Hou, 1982
 †Alectoris baryosefi Tchernov, 1980
 Arabian partridge, Alectoris melanocephala (Ruppell, 1835) 
 A. m. melanocephala (Rüppell 1835)
 A. m. guichardi Meinertzhagen 1951
 Przevalski's partridge, Alectoris magna (Prjevalsky, 1876) 
 A. m. magna (Przewalski 1876) (Przevalski's partridge)
 A. m. lanzhouensis Liu, Huang & Wen 2004 (Lanzhou rusty-necklaced partridge)
 Rock partridge, Alectoris graeca (Meisner, 1804) 
 A. g. saxatilis (Bechstein 1805) (Alpine/western rock partridge)
 A. g. graeca (Meisner 1804) (Balkan/eastern rock partridge)
 A. g. orlandoi Priolo 1984 (Italian rock partridge)
 A. g. whitakeri Schiebel 1934 (Sicilian rock partridge)
 Chukar, Alectoris chukar (Gray, 1830) 
 A. c. kleini Hartert 1925 (northern chukar; Klein's partridge)
 A. c. cypriotes Hartert 1917 (Island chukar)
 A. c. kurdestanica Meinertzhagen 1923 (Kurdestan chukar)
 A. c. sinaica (Bonaparte 1858) (Sinai chukar)
 A. c. werae (Zarudny & Loudon 1904) (Iranian partridge)
 A. c. koroviakovi (Zarudny 1914) (Persian chukar)
 A. c. subpallida (Zarudny 1914) (Tajikistan partridge)
 A. c. falki Hartert 1917 (Pamir partridge)
 A. c. dzungarica Sushkin 1927 (Mongolia partridge)
 A. c. pallida (Hume 1873) (Hume's chukor; northwestern partridge)
 A. c. pallescens (Hume 1873) (northern chukar)
 A. c. chukar (Gray 1830) (Indian chukor)
 A. c. potanini Sushkin 1927 (western partridge)
 A. c. pubescens (Swinhoe 1871) (Sichuan partridge)
 Philby's partridge, Alectoris philbyi Lowe, 1934 
 Barbary partridge, Alectoris barbara (Bonnaterre, 1791) 
 A. b. koenigi (Reichenow 1899) (Reichenow's Barbary partridge)
 A. b. spatzi (Reichenow 1895) (Saharan Barbary partridge)
 A. b. barbara (Bonnaterre 1790) (North African Barbary partridge)
 A. b. barbata (Reichenow 1896) (Cyrenaician Barbary partridge)
 Red-legged partridge, Alectoris rufa (Linnaeus, 1758) 
 A. r. rufa (Linnaeus 1758) (northern/French red-legged partridge)
 A. r. hispanica (Seoane 1894) (North Iberian red-legged partridge)
 A. r. intercedens (Brehm 1857) (South Iberian/Balearic red-legged partridge)
 Genus Ophrysia Bonaparte 1856
 Himalayan quail, Ophrysia superciliosa (Gray 1846) Bonaparte 1856  D
 Genus Perdicula Hodgson 1837 (Bush-Quails)
 Jungle bush quail, Perdicula asiatica (Latham, 1790) 
 P. a. punjaubi Whistler 1939 (Punjab jungle bush quail)
 P. a. asiatica (Latham 1790)
 P. a. vidali Whistler & Kinnear 1936 (Konkan jungle bush quail)
 P. a. vellorei Abdulali & Reuben 1965
 P. a. ceylonensis Whistler 1936 (Ceylon jungle bush quail)
 Rock bush quail, Perdicula argoondah (Sykes, 1832) 
 P. a. meinertzhageni Whistler 1937 (Rajasthan rock bush quail)
 P. a. argoondah (Sykes 1832) (Deccan rock bush quail)
 P. a. salimalii Whistler 1943 (Mysore/laterite rock bush quail)
 Painted bush quail, Perdicula erythrorhyncha (Sykes, 1832) 
 P. e. blewitti (Hume 1874) (eastern painted bush quail)
 P. e. erythrorhyncha (Sykes 1832) (red-billed bush quail)
 Manipur bush quail, Perdicula manipurensis Hume 1881  C2a(i)
 P. m. inglisi (Ogilvie-Grant 1909)
 P. m. manipurensis Hume 1881
 Genus Pternistis Wagler 1832 (Spurfowls)
 Scaly spurfowl, Pternistis squamatus (Cassin, 1857)
 P. s. squamatus (Cassin 1857)
 P. s. schuetti (Cabanis 1880) (Angola/Schütt's scaly francolin)
 P. s. maranensis (Mearns 1910) (Mt. Kenya/Kilimanjaro scaly francolin)
 P. s. usambarae (Conover 1928) (Usambara scaly francolin)
 P. s. uzungwensis (Bangs & Loveridge 1931) (Udzungwa scaly francolin)
 P. s. doni (Benson 1939)
 Ahanta spurfowl, Pternistis ahantensis (Temminck 1854)
 P. a. hopkinsoni (Bannerman 1934)
 P. a. ahantensis (Temminck 1854)
 Grey-striped spurfowl, Pternistis griseostriatus (Ogilvie-Grant, 1890)
 Hartlaub's spurfowl, Pternistis hartlaubi (Bocage 1870)
 Double-spurred spurfowl, Pternistis bicalcaratus (Linnaeus, 1766)
 P. b. ayesha (Hartert 1917) (Moroccan double-spurred francolin)
 P. b. bicalcaratus (Linnaeus 1766) (Adamawa double-spurred francolin)
 P. b. ogilviegranti (Bannerman 1922) (Banso double-spurred francolin)
 Heuglin's spurfowl, Pternistis icterorhynchus (Heuglin, 1863)
 Clapperton's spurfowl, Pternistis clappertoni (Children, 1826)
 P. c. clappertoni (Children & Vigors 1826)
 P. c. koenigseggi (Madarász 1914)
 P. c. heuglini (Neumann 1907) (White Nile Clapperton francolin)
 P. c. sharpii (Ogilvie-Grant 1892) (Abyssinian Clapperton francolin)
 P. c. nigrosquamatus (Neumann 1902) (black-spotted francolin)
 P. c. gedgii (Ogilvie-Grant 1891) (Uganda Clapperton/Gedge's francolin)
 Harwood's spurfowl, Pternistis harwoodi (Blundell & Lovat, 1899)
 Hildebrandt's spurfowl, Pternistis hildebrandti (Cabanis, 1878)
 P. h. altumi (Fischer & Reichenow 1884) (Naivasha/Kenya Hildebrandt francolin)
 P. h. hildebrandti (Cabanis 1878)
 P. h. johnstoni (Shelley 1894) (Nyasa Hildebrandt francolin)
 Jackson's spurfowl, Pternistis jacksoni (Ogilvie-Grant, 1891)
 Handsome spurfowl, Pternistis nobilis (Reichenow, 1908)
 Mount Cameroon spurfowl, Pternistis camerunensis (Alexander, 1909)
 Swierstra's spurfowl, Pternistis swierstrai (Roberts, 1929)
 Chestnut-naped spurfowl, Pternistis castaneicollis (Salvadori, 1888)
 P. c. ogoensis (Mackworth-Praed 1920) (Somaliland chestnut-naped francolin)
 P. c. castaneicollis (Salvadori 1888) 
 P. c. kaffanus (Grant & Mackworth-Praed 1934)
 P. c. atrifrons (Conover 1930) (Ethiopian chestnut-naped francolin)
 Erckel's spurfowl, Pternistis erckelii (Rüppell, 1835)
 Djibouti spurfowl, Pternistis ochropectus (Dorst & Jouanin, 1952)
 Red-billed spurfowl, Pternistis adspersus (Waterhouse, 1838)
 P. a. adspersus (Waterhouse 1838)
 P. a. mesicus Clancey 1996
 Cape spurfowl, Pternistis capensis (Gmelin, 1789)
 Natal spurfowl, Pternistis natalensis (Smith, 1833)
 P. n. neavei (Mackworth-Praed 1920) (Neave's Natal francolin)
 P. n. natalensis (Smith 1833)
 Yellow-necked spurfowl, Pternistis leucoscepus (Gray, 1867)
 Grey-breasted spurfowl, Pternistis rufopictus (Reichenow, 1887)
 Red-necked spurfowl, Pternistis afer (Statius Müller, 1776)
 P. a. harterti Reichenow 1909 (Bujumbura/Usumbura red-necked francolin)
 P. a. cranchii (Leach 1818) (Cranch's red-necked francolin)
 P. a. leucoparaeus (Fischer & Reichenow 1884) (Kenya/East African red-necked)
 P. a. melanogaster Neumann 1898
 P. a. afer (Statius Müller 1776) (Angola/bare-throated red-necked partridge)
 P. a. swynnertoni Sclater 1921 (Mashonaland red-necked francolin)
 P. a. castaneiventer Gunning & Roberts 1911 (Cape red-necked francolin)
 Swainson's spurfowl, Pternistis swainsonii (Smith, 1836)
 P. s. lundazi White 1947
 P. s. swainsonii (Smith 1836)

 Tribe Gallini Brehm 1831 (Junglefowl, Francolins)
 Genus Bambusicola Gould 1863
 Mountain bamboo partridge, Bambusicola fytchii Anderson 1871
 B. f. fytchii Anderson 1871
 B. f. hopkinsoni Godwin-Austen 1874 (Assam bamboo partridge)
 Chinese bamboo partridge, Bambusicola thoracica (Temminck 1815)
 Taiwan bamboo partridge, Bambusicola sonorivox (Gould 1863)
 Genus Gallus Brisson 1760 (Junglefowls)
 †Gallus aesculapii Jánossy 1976
 †Gallus beremendensis Jánossy 1977
 †Gallus georgicus Burchak-Abramovich & Potapova, 1995
 †Gallus imereticus Burchak-Abramovich & Potapova, 1996
 Giant junglefowl, †Gallus karabachensis Baryšnikov & Potapova 1995
 †Gallus kudarensis Burčak-Abramovič & Potapova, 1996
 †Gallus tscheriensis Burčak-Abramovič, 1996
 †Gallus tamanensis Burčak-Abramovič & Potapova, 1996
 Red junglefowl, Gallus gallus (Linnaeus, 1758)
 G. g. murghi Robinson & Kloss 1920 (Indian red junglefowl)
 G. g. spadiceus (Bonnaterre 1792) (Burmese red junglefowl)
 G. g. jabouillei Delacour & Kinnear 1928 (Tonkinese red junglefowl)
 G. g. gallus (Linnaeus 1758) (Cochin-Chinese red junglefowl)
 G. g. bankiva Temminck 1813 (Javan red junglefowl)
 Grey junglefowl, Gallus sonneratii Temminck, 1813
 Sri Lanka junglefowl, Gallus lafayetii Lesson, 1831
 Green junglefowl, Gallus varius (Shaw, 1798)
 Genus Peliperdix Bonaparte 1856
 Latham's francolin, Peliperdix lathami ((Hartlaub, 1854)
 P. l. lathami (Hartlaub 1854) (Latham's forest francolin)
 P. l. schubotzi (Reichenow 1912) (Schubotz's forest francolin)
Genus Ortygornis Reichenbach, 1852
 Crested francolin, Ortygornis sephaena (A. Smith, 1836)
 O. s. grantii (Hartlaub 1866) (Grant's crested francolin)
 O. s. rovuma (Gray 1867) (Kirk's/Rovuma crested francolin)
 O. s. spilogaster (Salvadori 1888) (Abyssinian/Shoa crested francolin)
 O. s. zambesiae (Mackworth-Praed 1920) (Zambesi crested francolin)
 O. s. sephaena (Smith 1836) (Smith's francolin)
Swamp francolin, Ortygornis gularis (Temminck, 1815)
 Grey francolin, Ortygornis pondicerianus (Gmelin, 1789)
 O. p. mecranensis Zarudny & Harms 1913 (Baluchistan grey francolin)
 O. p. interpositus Hartert 1917 (North Indian grey francolin)
 O. p. pondicerianus (Gmelin 1789) (Indian grey francolin)
 Genus Francolinus Stephens 1819 (sensu stricto)
 Chinese francolin, Francolinus pintadeanus (Scopoli, 1786)
 F. p. phayrei (Blyth 1843) (Burmese francolin)
 F. p. pintadeanus (Scopoli 1786) (Chinese francolin)
 Painted francolin, Francolinus pictus (Jardine & Selby, 1828)
 F. p. pallidus (Gray 1831)
 F. p. pictus (Jardine & Selby 1828) (Indian painted francolin)
 F. p. watsoni Legge 1880 (Sri Lankan painted francolin)
 Black francolin, Francolinus francolinus (Linnaeus, 1766)
 †F. f. billypayni (Amik Gölü black francolin)
 †F. f. ssp. (Sicilian black francolin)
 F. f. francolinus (Linnaeus 1766) (western black francolin)
 F. f. arabistanicus Zarudny & Harms 1913 (Iranian black francolin)
 F. f. bogdanovi Zarudny 1906 (southern francolin)
 F. f. henrici Bonaparte 1856 (South Persian black francolin)
 F. f. asiae Bonaparte 1856 (Indian black francolin)
 F. f. melanonotus Hume 1888 (eastern francolin)
 Genus Campocolinus Crowe et al, 2020
Coqui francolin, Campocolinus coqui (Smith, 1836)
 C. c. spinetorum (Bates 1928) 
 C. c. maharao (Sclater 1927) 
 C. c. hubbardi (Ogilvie-Grant 1895) (Hubbard's coqui francolin)
 C. c. coqui (Smith 1836) 
 Schlegel's francolin, Campocolinus schlegelii (Heuglin, 1863)
 White-throated francolin, Campocolinus albogularis (Hartlaub, 1854)
 C. a. albogularis (Hartlaub 1854)
 C. a. buckleyi (Ogilvie-Grant 1892) (Nigerian white-throated francolin)
 C. a. dewittei (Chapin 1937)
Genus Scleroptila Blyth 1852
 Ring-necked francolin, Scleroptila streptophorus (Ogilvie-Grant, 1891)
 Red-winged francolin, Scleroptila levaillantii (Valenciennes, 1825)
 S. l. kikuyuensis Ogilvie-Grant 1897) (Ruanda red-winged francolin)
 S. l. crawshayi (Ogilvie-Grant 1896) (Nyasa red-winged francolin)
 S. l. levaillantii (Valenciennes 1825) (Cape red-wing francolin)
 Finsch's francolin, Scleroptila finschi (Bocage, 1881)
 Moorland francolin, Scleroptila psilolaemus (Gray, 1867)
 S. p. psilolaema (Gray 1867) (Shoa/Harris' francolin)
 S. p. elgonensis (Ogilvie-Grant 1891) (Elgon chestnut-bellied francolin)
 Orange River francolin, Scleroptila levaillantoides (Smith, 1836)
 Grey-winged francolin, Scleroptila africanus (Stephens, 1819)
 Shelley's francolin, Scleroptila shelleyi (Ogilvie-Grant, 1890)
 S. s. uluensis (Ogilvie-Grant 1892) (Ulu/Kenya grey-wing francolin)
 S. s. macarthuri (van Someren 1938) 
 S. s. shelleyi (Ogilvie-Grant 1890) (Ugalla Shelley's francolin)
 S. s. whytei (Neumann 1908) (Nyasa Shelley's francolin)
 Archer's francolin, Scleroptila gutturalis (Ruppell, 1835)
 S. g. jugularis (Büttikofer 1889) (Angola/Kalahari Orange River francolin)
 S. g. pallidior (Neumann 1908)
 S. g. gutturalis (Rüppell 1835) (Abyssinian/Ethiopian/Rüppell's francolin)
 S. g. archeri (Sclater 1927) (northern acacia/Archer's francolin)
 S. g. lorti (Sharpe 1897) (Somaliland Orange River francolin)

 Tribe Pavonini Rafinesque 1815 (Peafowl)
 Genus Rheinardia Maingonnat 1882
 Vietnamese crested argus, Rheinardia ocellata (Elliot 1871) Maingonnat 1882
 Malayan crested argus, Rheinardia nigrescens Rothschild 1902 
 Genus Argusianus Rafinesque 1815
 Great argus, Argusianus argus Linnaeus 1766) Gray 1849
 A. a. grayi (Elliot 1865) (Bornean great argus)
 A. a. argus (Linnaeus 1766) (Malayan great argus)
 Genus Pavo Linnaeus 1758
 †Pavo archiaci (Gaudry 1862a) Mlíkovský 2002
 †Pavo bravardi (Gervais 1849) Mourer-Chauviré 1989b
 Indian peafowl Pavo cristatus Linnaeus 1758
 Green peafowl, Pavo muticus Linnaeus 1766
 P. m. spicifer Shaw 1804 (Burmese green peafowl)
 P. m. imperator Delacour 1949 (Indo-Chinese green peafowl)
 P. m. muticus Linnaeus 1766 (Malay/Pahang peafowl)
 Genus Afropavo Chapin 1936
 Congo peacock, Afropavo congensis Chapin 1936

 Tribe Polyplectronini Blyth 1852 (Peacock-Pheasants)
 Genus Haematortyx Sharpe, 1879
 Crimson-headed partridge, Haematortyx sanguiniceps Sharpe, 1879
 Genus Galloperdix Blyth 1845
 Painted Spurfowl, Galloperdix lunulata (Valenciennes 1825)
 Sri Lanka Spurfowl, Galloperdix bicalcarata (Forster 1781)
 Red Spurfowl, Galloperdix spadicea (Gmelin 1789)
 G. s. spadicea (Gmelin 1789)
 G. s. caurina Blanford 1898 (Aravalli red spurfowl)
 G. s. stewarti Baker 1919 (Travancore red spurfowl)
 Genus Polyplectron Temminck, 1807 (peacock-pheasants)
 Palawan peacock-pheasant, Polyplectron emphanum Lesson, 1831
 Malayan peacock-pheasant, Polyplectron malacense (Scopoli, 1786)
 Bornean peacock-pheasant, Polyplectron schleiermacheri Brüggemann, 1877
 Germain's peacock-pheasant, Polyplectron germaini Elliot, 186603)
 Hainan peacock-pheasant,  Polyplectron katsumatae Rothschild, 1906
 Mountain peacock-pheasant, Polyplectron inopinatum (Rothschild, 1903)
 Grey peacock-pheasant, Polyplectron bicalcaratum (Linnaeus, 1758)
 Bronze-tailed peacock-pheasant, Polyplectron chalcurum Lesson, 1831
 P. c. scutulatum Chasen 1941 (North Sumatran bronze-tailed peacock-pheasant)
 P. c. chalcurum Lesson 1831 (South Sumatran bronze-tailed peacock-pheasant)

 Genus Ithaginis Wagler 1832
 Blood pheasant, Ithaginis cruentus (Hardwicke 1821) Wagler 1832
 I. c. cruentus (Hardwicke 1821) (Himalayan blood pheasant)
 I. c. affinis Beebe 1912
 I. c. tibetanus Baker 1914 (Tibetan blood pheasant)
 I. c. kuseri Beebe 1912 (Kuser's blood pheasant)
 I. c. marionae Mayr 1941 (Mrs. Vernay's blood pheasant)
 I. c. rocki Riley 1925 (Rock's blood pheasant)
 I. c. clarkei Rothschild 1920 (Clarke's blood pheasant)
 I. c. geoffroyi Verreaux 1867 (Geoffroy's blood pheasant)
 I. c. berezowskii Bianchi 1904 (Berezovski's blood pheasant)
 I. c. beicki Mayr & Birckhead 1937 (Beick's blood pheasant)
 I. c. michaelis Bianchi 1904 (Bianchi's blood pheasant)
 I. c. sinensis David 1873 (David's blood pheasant)

 Tribe Lophophorini Gray 1841 (Monals & Tragopans)
 Genus Tragopan Cuvier 1829 non Gray 1841
 Western tragopan, (Tragopan melanocephalus)
 Satyr tragopan, (Tragopan satyra)
 Blyth's tragopan, (Tragopan blythii)
 T. b. molesworthi Baker 1914 (Molesworth's tragopan)
 T. b. blythii (Jerdon 1870)
 Temminck's tragopan, (Tragopan temminckii)
 Cabot's tragopan, (Tragopan caboti)
 T. c. caboti (Gould 1857)
 T. c. guangxiensis Cheng & Wu 1979
 Genus Lophophorus Temminck 1813 non Agassiz 1846 (monals)
 Chinese monal, Lophophorus lhuysii Saint-Hilaire 1866
 Himalayan monal, Lophophorus impejanus (Latham 1790)
 Sclater's monal, Lophophorus sclateri Jerdon 1870
 T. s. arunachalensis Kumar & Singh 2004
 T. s. sclateri Jerdon 1870
 T. s. orientalis Davison 1974
 Genus Lerwa Hodgson 1837
 Snow partridge, Lerwa lerwa (Hodgson 1833) Hodgson 1837
 Genus Tetraophasis Elliot 1871 (monal-partridge)
 Verreaux's monal-partridge, Tetraophasis obscurus (Verreaux 1869)
 Szechenyi's monal-partridge, Tetraophasis szechenyii Madarász 1885

 Tribe Phasianini Horsfield, 1821 (Pheasants)
 Genus Perdix Brisson, 1760
 †Perdix inferna (Kurochkin, 1985)
 †Perdix margaritae Kuročkin, 1985
 †Perdix palaeoperdix Mourer-Chauviré, 1975
 Tibetan partridge, Perdix hodgsoniae (Hodgson, 1856)
 P. h. caraganae Meinertzhagen & Meinertzhagen, 1926
 P. h. hodgsoniae (Hodgson, 1856)
 P. h. sifanica Przewalski, 1876
 Daurian partridge, Perdix dauurica (Pallas, 1811)
 P. d. dauurica (Pallas, 1811)
 P. d. suschkini Poliakov, 1915
 Grey partridge, Perdix perdix (Linnaeus, 1758)
 P. p. perdix (Linnaeus, 1758)
 P. p. armoricana Hartert, 1917
 P. p. sphagnetorum (Altum, 1894)
 P. p. hispaniensis Reichenow, 1892 (Iberian partridge)
 †P. p. italica Hartert, 1917 (Italian grey partridge)
 P. p. lucida (Altum, 1894) (eastern grey partridge)
 P. p. canescens Buturlin, 1906 (southern grey partridge)
 P. p. robusta Homeyer & Tancre, 1883 (southeastern grey partridge)
 Genus Syrmaticus Wagler, 1832 (long-tailed pheasants)
 †Syrmaticus kozlovae Kuročkin, 1985
 Reeve's pheasant, Syrmaticus reevesi (Gray, 1829)
 Mikado pheasant, Syrmaticus mikado (Ogilvie-Grant, 1906)
 Elliot's pheasant, Syrmaticus ellioti (Swinhoe, 1872)
 Mrs. Hume's pheasant, Syrmaticus humiae (Hume, 1881)
 S. h. humiae (Hume, 1881)
 S. h. burmanicus (Oates, 1898)
 Copper pheasant, Syrmaticus soemmerringi (Temminck, 1830)
 S. s. scintillans (Gould, 1866) (Scintillating Copper pheasant)
 S. s. subrufus (Kuroda, 1919) (Pacific Copper pheasant)
 S. s. intermedius (Kuroda, 1919) (Shikoku Copper pheasant)
 S. s. soemmerringii (Temminck, 1830) (Soemmering's Copper pheasant)
 S. s. ijimae (Dresser, 1902) (Ijima Copper pheasant)
 Genus Phasianus (typical pheasants)
 †Phasianus lufengia Hou, 1985
 †Phasianus yanshansis Huang & Hou, 1984
 Green pheasant Phasianus versicolor Vieillot, 1825
 P. v. robustipes Kuroda, 1919 (northern green pheasant)
 P. v. tohkaidi Momiyama, 1922 (Shikoku green pheasant)
 P. v. tanensis Kuroda, 1919 (Pacific green pheasant)
 P. v. versicolor Vieillot, 1825 (Kyushu/southern green pheasant)
 Common pheasant, Phasianus colchicus Linnaeus, 1758
 P. c. colchicus subspecies-group
 P. c. septentrionalis Lorenz, 1889 (West Caspian common pheasant)
 P. c. colchicus Linnaeus, 1758 (Caucasus pheasants)
 P. c. talischensis Lorenz, 1889 (South Caspian common pheasant)
 P. c. persicus Severtsov, 1875 (Persian common pheasant)
 P. c. mongolicus subspecies-group
 P. c. mongolicus von Brandt, 1844 (Mongolian ring-necked pheasants)
 P. c. hagenbecki Rothschild, 1901 (Kobdo common/Hagenbeck's pheasant)
 P. c. edzinensis Sushkin, 1926 (Gobi ring-necked pheasant)
 P. c. turcestanicus Lorenz, 1896 (Syr-Darya pheasant)
 P. c. principalis-chrysomelas subspecies-group
 P. c. principalis Sclater, 1885 (Prince of Wales' pheasant)
 P. c. chrysomelas Severtsov, 1875 (White-winged/Khivan pheasants)
 P. c. zarudnyi Buturlin, 1904 (Amu-Darya common pheasant)
 P. c. bianchii Buturlin, 1904 (Bianchi's common pheasant)
 P. c. zerafschanicus Tarnovski, 1891 (Zerafshan pheasant)
 P. c. tarimensis subspecies-group
 P. c. shawii Elliot, 1870 (Shaw's/Yarkand common pheasant)
 P. c. tarimensis Pleske, 1889 (Tarim common pheasants)
 P. c. torquatus subspecies-group
 P. c. vlangalii Przewalski, 1876 (Zaidam/Vlangali's pheasant)
 P. c. strauchi Przewalski, 1876 (Strauch's pheasant)
 P. c. sohokhotensis Buturlin, 1908 (Sohokhoto common pheasant)
 P. c. satscheuensis Pleske, 1892 (Satchu ring-necked pheasant)
 P. c. alaschanicus Alphéraky & Bianchi, 1908 (Alashan pheasant)
 P. c. kiangsuensis Buturlin, 1904 (Shansi ring-necked pheasant)
 P. c. karpowi Buturlin, 1904 (Korean ring-necked pheasant)
 P. c. pallasi Rothschild, 1903 (Manchurian ring-necked pheasant)
 P. c. suehschanensis Bianchi, 1906 (Sungpan pheasant)
 P. c. elegans Elliot, 1870 (Stone's pheasant)
 P. c. decollatus Swinhoe, 1870 (Kweichow pheasant)
 P. c. rothschildi La Touche, 1922 (Rothschild's pheasant)
 P. c. takatsukasae Delacour, 1927 (Tonkinese ring-necked pheasant)
 P. c. torquatus Gmelin, 1789 (Chinese Ring-necked Pheasant)
 P. c. formosanus Elliot, 1870 (Taiwan common pheasant)
 Genus Chrysolophus Gray, 1834 (ruffed pheasants)
 Golden pheasant, Chrysolophus pictus (Linnaeus, 1758)
 Lady Amherst's pheasant, Chrysolophus amherstiae (Leadbeater, 1829)
 Genus Crossoptilon Hodgson 1838 (eared pheasants)
 Brown eared pheasant, Crossoptilon mantchuricum Swinhoe, 1863 
 Blue eared pheasant, Crossoptilon auritum (Pallas, 1811)
 Tibetan eared pheasant, Crossoptilon harmani Elwes, 1881
 White-eared pheasant, Crossoptilon crossoptilon (Hodgson, 1838)
 C. c. dolani Meyer de Schauensee, 1937 (Dolan's white eared pheasant)
 C. c. crossoptilon (Hodgson, 1838) (Szechuan white eared pheasant)
 C. c. lichiangense Delacour, 1945 (Yunnan white eared pheasant)
 C. c. drouynii Verreaux, 1868 (Tibetan white eared pheasant)
 Genus Catreus Cabanis, 1851
 Cheer pheasant, Catreus wallichi (Hardwicke, 1827)
 Genus Lophura Fleming, 1822 (gallopheasants)
 †Lophura wayrei Harrison & Walker, 1982
 Hoogerwerf's pheasant, Lophura hoogerwerfi (Chasen, 1939)
 Salvadori's pheasant, Lophura inornata (Salvadori, 1879)
 Crestless fireback, Lophura erythrophthalma (Raffles, 1822)
 Malayan crestless fireback, L. e. erythrophthalma (Raffles, 1822)
 Bornean crestless fireback, L. e. pyronota (Gray, 1841)
 Siamese fireback, Lophura diardi (Bonaparte, 1856)
 Crested fireback, Lophura ignita (Shaw, 1798)
 Lesser Bornean crested fireback, L. i. ignita (Shaw, 1798)
 Greater Bornean crested fireback, L. i. nobilis (Sclater, 1863)
 Vieilott's crested fireback, L. i. rufa (Raffles, 1822)
 Delacour's crested fireback, L. i. macartneyi (Temminck, 1813)
 Bulwer's pheasant, Lophura bulweri (Sharpe, 1874)
 Swinhoe's pheasant, Lophura swinhoii (Gould, 1863)
 Edward's pheasant, Lophura edwardsi (Oustalet, 1896)
 Vietnamese pheasant, Lophura hatinhensis
 Kalij pheasant, L. leucomelanos (Latham, 1790)
 White-crested kalij pheasant, L. l. hamiltoni (Gray, 1829)
 Nepal kalij pheasant, L. l. leucomelanos (Latham, 1790)
 Black-backed kalij pheasant, L. l. melanota (Hutton, 1848)
 Black kalij pheasant, L. l. moffitti (Hachisuka, 1938)
 Black-breasted kalij pheasant, L. l. lathami (Gray, 1829)
 William's kalij pheasant, L. l. williamsi (Oates, 1898)
 Oates' kalij pheasant, L. l. oatesi (Ogilvie-Grant, 1893)
 Crawfurd's kalij pheasant, L. l. crawfurdi (Gray, 1829)
 Lineated kalij pheasant, L. l. lineata (Vigors, 1831)
 Silver pheasant, L. nycthemera (Linnaeus, 1758)
 L. n. omeiensis Cheng, Chang & Tang, 1964 (Szechwan silver pheasant)
 L. n. rongjiangensis Tan & Wu, 1981 (Kweichow silver pheasant)
 L. n. nycthemera (Linnaeus 1758)
 L. n. fokiensis Delacour, 1948 (Fokien silver pheasant)
 L. n. whiteheadi (Ogilvie-Grant, 1899) (Hainan silver pheasant)
 L. n. occidentalis Delacour, 1948 (western silver pheasant)
 L. n. rufipes (Oates, 1898) (ruby mines silver pheasant)
 L. n. jonesi (Oates, 1903) (Jones's pheasant)
 L. n. ripponi (Sharpe, 1902) (Rippon's silver pheasant)
 L. n. beaulieui Delacour, 1948 (Lao silver pheasant)
 L. n. berliozi (Delacour & Jabouille, 1928) (Berlioz's silver pheasant)
 L. n. beli (Oustalet, 1898) (Bel's silver pheasant)
 L. n. annamensis (Ogilvie-Grant, 1906) (Annam silver pheasant)
 L. n. lewisi (Delacour & Jabouille, 1928) (Lewis's silver pheasant)
 L. n. engelbachi Delacour, 1948 (Boloven silver pheasant)

 Tribe Tetraonini Leach, 1820 [Meliperdicinae] (Grouse & Turkeys)
 Genus Pucrasia Gray, 1841
 Koklass pheasant, Pucrasia macrolopha (Lesson, 1829) Gray 1841
 P. m. castanea Gould, 1855 (Western koklass pheasant)
 P. m. biddulphi Marshall, 1879 (Kashmir koklass pheasant)
 P. m. macrolopha (Lesson, 1829) (Indian koklass pheasant)
 P. m. nipalensis Gould, 1855 (Nepal koklass pheasant)
 P. m. meyeri Madarász, 1886 (Meyer's koklass pheasant)
 P. m. ruficollis David & Oustalet, 1877 (Orange-collared koklass pheasant)
 P. m. xanthospila Gray, 1864 (Yellow-necked koklass pheasant)
 P. m. joretiana Heude, 1883 (Joret's koklass pheasant)
 P. m. darwini Swinhoe, 1872 (Darwin's koklass pheasant)
 Genus Meleagris Linnaeus, 1758 (Turkeys)
 †Meleagris anza (Howard, 1963)
 †Meleagris californica (Miller, 1909) (Californian turkey)
 †Meleagris celer Marsh, 1872
 †Meleagris crassipes Rea, 1980
 †Meleagris leopoldi Miller & Bowman, 1956
 †Meleagris progenies (Brodkorb, 1964)
 †Meleagris superba Cope, 1870c
 †Meleagris tridens Wetmore, 1931
 Ocellated turkey, Meleagris ocellata Cuvier, 1820
 Wild turkey, Meleagris gallopavo Linnaeus, 1758
 M. g. silvestris Vieillot, 1817 (Eastern Wild Turkey)
 M. g. osceola Scott, 1890 (Florida wild turkey)
 M. g. intermedia Sennett, 1879 (Rio Grande wild turkey)
 M. g. mexicana Gould, 1856 (Gould's wild turkey)
 M. g. merriami Nelson, 1900 (Merriam's Wild Turkey)
 M. g. gallopavo Linnaeus, 1758 (South Mexican wild turkey)
 Genus Bonasa Stephens, 1819
 †Bonasa dalianensis (Hou, 1990)
 †Bonasa nini Sánchez Marco, 2009
 Ruffed grouse, Bonasa umbellus (Linnaeus, 1766)
 B. u. yukonensis Grinnell, 1916 (Yukon ruffed grouse)
 B. u. umbelloides (Douglas, 1829) (gray ruffed grouse)
 B. u. labradorensis Ouellet, 1991 (Labrador ruffed grouse)
 B. u. castanea Aldrich & Friedmann, 1943 (Olympic ruffed grouse)
 B. u. obscura Todd 1947
 B. u. sabini (Douglas, 1829) (Oregon ruffed grouse)
 B. u. brunnescens Conover, 1935 (Vancouver ruffed grouse)
 B. u. togata (Linnaeus, 1766) (St. Lawrence ruffed grouse)
 B. u. mediana Todd, 1940 (Midwestern ruffed grouse)
 B. u. phaios Aldrich & Friedmann, 1943 (Idaho ruffed grouse)
 B. u. incana Aldrich & Friedmann, 1943 (hoary ruffed grouse)
 B. u. monticola Todd, 1940 (Appalachian ruffed grouse)
 B. u. umbellus (Linnaeus, 1766) (eastern ruffed grouse)
 Genus Tetrastes Keyserling & Blasius, 1840
 Chinese grouse, Tetrastes sewerzowi Przewalski, 1876
 T. s. sewerzowi Przewalski, 1876
 T. s. secundus Riley, 1925
 Hazel grouse, Tetrastes bonasia (Linnaeus, 1758)
 T. b. rhenanus (Kleinschmidt, 1917)
 T. b. styriacus (von Jordans & Schiebel, 1944)
 T. b. schiebeli (Kleinschmidt, 1943) (Balkan hazel grouse)
 T. b. rupestris (Brehm, 1831) (southern hazel grouse)
 T. b. bonasia (Linnaeus, 1758) (northern hazel grouse)
 T. b. griseonota Salomonsen, 1947
 T. b. sibiricus Buturlin, 1916 (Siberian hazel grouse)
 T. b. kolymensis Buturlin, 1916
 T. b. amurensis Riley, 1916 (Amur hazel grouse)
 T. b. yamashinai Momiyama, 1928
 T. b. vicinitas Riley, 1915 (Hokkaido hazel grouse)
 Genus Centrocercus Swainson, 1832 (sage grouse)
 Greater sage-grouse, Centrocercus urophasianus (Bonaparte, 1827)
 Gunnison sage-grouse, Centrocercus minimus Young et al., 2000
 Genus Dendragapus Elliot, 1864
 †Dendragapus gilli (Shufeldt, 1891) Brodkorb 1964
 †Dendragapus lucasi Jehl, 1969
 Dusky grouse, Dendragapus obscurus (Say, 1822)
 D. o. richardsonii (Douglas, 1829) (Richardson's dusky grouse)
 D. o. pallidus Swarth, 1931 (Oregon dusky grouse)
 D. o. oreinus Behle & Selander, 1951 (Great Basin dusky grouse)
 D. o. obscurus (Say, 1822) (dusky blue grouse)
 Sooty grouse, Dendragapus fuliginosus (Ridgway, 1873)
 D. f. sitkensis Swarth, 1921 (Sitkan sooty grouse)
 D. f. fuliginosus (Ridgway, 1873)
 D. f. sierrae Chapman, 1904 (Sierra sooty grouse)
 D. f. howardi Dickey & van Rossem, 1923 (Mount Pinos sooty grouse)
 Genus Tympanuchus Gloger, 1841 (prairie grouse)
 †Tympanuchus lulli Shuefeldt, 1915
 †Tympanuchus stirtoni Miller, 1944
 †Tympanuchus lurasi (Shufeldt, 1891)
 †Tympanuchus nanus (Shufeldt, 1892)
 Lesser prairie chicken Tympanuchus pallidicinctus (Ridgway, 1873)
 Greater prairie chicken, Tympanuchus cupido (Linnaeus, 1758)
 Attwater's prairie chicken, T. c. attwateri Bendire, 1893
 T. c. pinnatus (Brewster, 1885)
 Heath Hen, T. c. cupido (Linnaeus, 1758) (extinct, 1932)
 Sharp-tailed grouse, Tympanuchus phasianellus (Linnaeus, 1758)
 T. p. caurus (Friedmann, 1943) (Alaskan sharp-tailed grouse)
 T. p. kennicotti (Suckley, 1861) (Mackenzie sharp-tailed grouse)
 T. p. phasianellus (Linnaeus, 1758) (northern sharp-tailed grouse)
 Columbian sharp-tailed grouse, T. p. columbianus (Ord, 1815)
 New Mexico sharp-tailed grouse, †T. p. hueyi Dickerman & Hubbard, 1994
 T. p. jamesi (Lincoln, 1917) (plains sharp-tailed grouse)
 T. p. campestris (Ridgway, 1884) (prairie sharp-tailed grouse)
 Genus Lagopus Brisson, 1760 (ptarmigans)
 †Lagopus atavus (Jánossy, 1974a)
 †Lagopus balcanicus Boev, 1995
 White-tailed ptarmigan, Lagopus leucura (Richardson, 1831)
 L. l. peninsularis Chapman, 1902 (Kenai white-tailed ptarmigan)
 L. l. leucura (Richardson, 1831) (northern white-tailed ptarmigan)
 L. l. rainierensis Taylor, 1920 (Rainier white-tailed ptarmigan)
 L. l. saxatilis Cowan, 1939 (Vancouver white-tailed ptarmigan)
 L. l. altipetens Osgood, 1901 (southern white-tailed ptarmigan)
 Willow ptarmigan, Lagopus lagopus (Linnaeus, 1758)
 †L. l. noaillensis Mourer-Chauviré, 1975
 Red grouse, L. l. scoticus (Latham, 1787)
 L. l. variegata Salomonsen, 1936 (Trondheim willow ptarmigan)
 L. l. lagopus (Linnaeus, 1758) (Lapland willow ptarmigan)
 L. l. rossica Serebrovski, 1926 (southern willow ptarmigan)
 L. l. koreni Thayer & Bangs, 1914 (North Siberian willow ptarmigan)
 L. l. maior Lorenz, 1904 (large willow ptarmigan)
 L. l. brevirostris Hesse, 1912 (small-billed willow ptarmigan)
 L. l. kozlowae Portenko, 1931
 L. l. sserebrowsky Domaniewski, 1933 (East Siberian willow ptarmigan)
 L. l. okadai Momiyama, 1928 (Sakhalin willow ptarmigan)
 L. l. alascensis Swarth, 1926 (Alaska willow ptarmigan)
 L. l. alexandrae Grinnell, 1909 (Alexander's willow ptarmigan)
 L. l. leucoptera Taverner, 1932 (Baffin Island willow ptarmigan)
 L. l. alba (Gmelin, 1789) (Keewatin willow ptarmigan)
 L. l. ungavus Riley, 1911 (Ungava willow ptarmigan)
 L. l. alleni Stejneger, 1884 (Newfoundland willow ptarmigan)
 Rock ptarmigan, Lagopus muta (Montin, 1781)
 †L. m. correzensis Mourer-Chauviré, 1975
 L. m. muta (Montin, 1781) (Scandinavian rock ptarmigan)
 L. m. millaisi Hartert, 1923 (Scottish rock ptarmigan)
 L. m. helvetica (Thienemann, 1829) (Alps rock ptarmigan)
 L. m. pyrenaica Hartert, 1921 (Pyrenees rock ptarmigan)
 L. m. pleskei Serebrovski, 1926
 L. m. nadezdae Serebrovski, 1926 (Altai rock ptarmigan)
 L. m. gerasimovi Red'kin, 2005
 L. m. ridgwayi Stejneger, 1884 (Commander Island rock ptarmigan) 
 L. m. kurilensis Kuroda, 1924 (Kuril rock ptarmigan)
 L. m. japonica Clark, 1907 (Japanese rock ptarmigan)
 L. m. evermanni Elliot, 1896 (Attu rock ptarmigan)
 L. m. townsendi Elliot, 1896 (Kiska rock ptarmigan)
 L. m. atkhensis Turner, 1882 (Atka rock ptarmigan)
 L. m. yunaskensis Gabrielson & Lincoln, 1951 (Yunaska rock ptarmigan)
 L. m. nelsoni Stejneger, 1884 (Nelson rock ptarmigan)
 L. m. dixoni Grinnell, 1909 (coastal rock ptarmigan)
 L. m. rupestris (Gmelin, 1789) (Canadian rock ptarmigan)
 L. m. welchi Brewster, 1885 (Newfoundland rock ptarmigan)
 L. m. saturata Salomonsen, 1950 (West Greenland rock ptarmigan)
 L. m. macruros Schiøler, 1925 (East Greenland rock ptarmigan)
 L. m. reinhardi (Brehm, 1824) (Reinhardt's rock ptarmigan)
 L. m. hyperborea Sundevall, 1845 (Svalbard rock ptarmigan)
 L. m. islandorum (Faber, 1822) (Icelandic rock ptarmigan)
 Genus Falcipennis Elliot, 1864
 Siberian grouse, Falcipennis falcipennis (Hartlaub, 1855) Elliot, 1864
 Genus Canachites Stejneger, 1885
 Spruce grouse, Canachites canadensis
 C. c. osgoodi (Bishop, 1900) (Alaskan spruce grouse)
 C. c. atratus (Grinnell, 1910) (Valdez spruce grouse)
 C. c. canadensis (Linnaeus, 1758) (Hudsonian spruce grouse)
 C. c. canace (Linnaeus, 1766) (Canadian spruce grouse)
C. c. franklinii (Douglas, 1829) (Franklin's grouse)
C. f. isleibi (Dickerman & Gustafson, 1996) (Prince of Wales spruce grouse)
 Genus Tetrao Linnaeus, 1758 (capercallies)
 †Tetrao conjugens Jánossy, 1974
 †Tetrao macropus Jánossy, 1976
 †Tetrao praeurogallus Jánossy, 1969
 †Tetrao rhodopensis Boev, 1998
 Black-billed capercaillie, Tetrao urogalloides Middendorf, 1853 [Tetrao parvirostris Bonaparte 1856]
 T. u. urogalloides Middendorf, 1853 (Siberian capercaillie)
 T. u. kamtschaticus Kittlitz, 1858 (Kamchatka black-billed capercaillie)
 Western capercaillie, Tetrao urogallus Linnaeus, 1758
 Cantabrian capercaillie, Tetrao urogallus cantabricus Castroviejo, 1967
 T. u. aquitanicus Ingram, 1915 (Pyrenees capercaillie)
 T. u. crassirostris Brehm, 1831 (black-bellied capercaillie)
 T. u. volgensis Buturlin, 1907
 T. u. urogallus Linnaeus, 1758 (northern western capercaillie)
 T. u. kureikensis Buturlin, 1927
 T. u. uralensis Nazarov, 1886 (white-bellied capercaillie)
 T. u. taczanowskii (Stejneger, 1885) (southern capercaillie)
Genus Lyrurus Swainson, 1832 (black grouse) 
Caucasian grouse, Lyrurus mlokosiewiczi (Taczanowski, 1875)
 Black grouse, Lyrurus tetrix (Linnaeus, 1758)
 †L. t. longipes Mourer-Chauviré, 1975
 L. t. britannicus Witherby & Lönnberg, 1913 (British black grouse)
 L. t. tetrix (Linnaeus, 1758) (northern black grouse)
 L. t. viridanus (Lorenz, 1891) (southern black grouse)
 L. t. baikalensis (Lorenz, 1911) (Baikal black grouse)
 L. t. mongolicus (Lönnberg, 1904) (Tien Shan black grouse)
 L. t. ussuriensis (Kohts, 1911) (Ussurian black grouse)

References

Galliformes